Judith Therpauve is a French drama film directed by Patrice Chéreau.

Plot
Therpauve Judith, who was "Queen" in the days of the Resistance is asked by his former friends, as she co-owners of the regional newspaper "The Free Republic" to take charge of the daily, is wrong. She quickly realizes that the poor financial health of the newspaper is orchestrated by a businessman who wants to buy it back at a low price. Judith manages to drive up sales, but unfair maneuvers succeed and forced to sell. Little support from his staff, feeling useless and alone, she commits suicide.

Cast

 Simone Signoret : Judith Therpauve
 Philippe Léotard : Jean-Pierre Maurier
 Robert Manuel : Droz
 François Simon : Claude Hirsch-Balland
 Daniel Lecourtois : Desfraizeaux
 László Szabó : Lepage
 Daniel Schmid : Jean
 Bernard-Pierre Donnadieu : Laindreaux
 Marcel Imhoff : Pierre Damien
 Jean Rougeul : Genty
 Alain David : Louis
 Jean Rougerie : Fournol
 Hermine Karagheuz : Nicole
 Gérard Dournel : Lecacheux
 Jean Berger : Marc Loussier
 Laurence Bourdil : Marianne
 Marie-Paule André : Jeanne
 Anne Delbée : Gisèle
 Fabienne Arel : Sonia
 Philippe Castelli : The Bailiff

Accolades

References

External links

1978 films
1978 drama films
French drama films
1970s French films